The Dallas Police Department, established in 1881, is the principal law enforcement agency serving the city of Dallas, Texas.

Organization 

The department is headed by a chief of police who is appointed by the city manager who, in turn, is hired by the Dallas City Council. The city manager is not an elected official.

Primary responsibility for calls for police service are seven operations divisions based on geographical subdivisions of the city. Each operations division is commanded by a deputy chief of police. The divisions are designated Central, Northeast, Southeast, South Central, Southwest, Northwest and North Central and operate from facilities which are referred to as substations. Each operations division's geographical area is further subdivided into sectors which are composed of beats, each of which is normally patrolled by a uniformed officer or officers in a marked squad car. Calls for service are received primarily through the city's 9-1-1 system which is answered by a city-operated emergency communications center. Each substation also has an investigative unit with detectives who are assigned cases of burglary and theft which are committed within the area covered by their division.

Other crimes are investigated by specialized investigative units including the Child Abuse Squad, Family Violence Squad, Narcotics Division, CAPERS [Crimes Against Persons] Robbery, Assault, and Homicide Units, Forgery Squad and a Computer Crimes Team.

A specialized Tactical Division includes a SWAT Operations Unit, Mounted Unit, Canine Unit, Helicopter Unit and an Explosive Ordnance Squad. The SWAT Operations Unit was featured on a reality series for the A&E Network in 2006 entitled "Dallas SWAT".

Officers usually are armed with a SIG-Sauer P226 usually in 9mm with some in .357 SIG as their sidearm, but some officers do carry Glock pistols.

History 
The first Chief of Police, J. C. Arnold, was elected in 1881. Prior to that, an elected Town Marshal and deputies had guarded Dallas since 1856. Arnold held the position for 17 years.

By 1898, 34 officers patrolled the city on horseback. In 1907, the department acquired an automobile and two motorcycles.

During the heyday of the Ku Klux Klan in Dallas in the 1920s, a sizable number of DPD were KKK members, including police commissioners and police chiefs. One list of members includes at least 106 Dallas police officers, which at the time was the majority of the police department. During this period, the DPD did not protect the non-white community in Dallas and did not pursue cases involving racial violence against Blacks.

Line-of-duty deaths 
According to The Officer Down Memorial Page, between 1892 and 2016, 84 members of the Dallas Police Department died in the line of duty. The best-known instance was the murder of Officer J. D. Tippit by Lee Harvey Oswald, approximately 40 minutes after Oswald shot President John F. Kennedy on November 22, 1963.

Other notable deaths include the murder of Officer Robert W. Wood on November 28, 1976, which was later examined in Errol Morris' documentary, The Thin Blue Line. Additionally, Senior Corporal Victor Lozada, a motorcycle officer in the Traffic Division, was killed on February 22, 2008, while serving as part of an escort to Senator Hillary Clinton's motorcade near downtown Dallas for a presidential campaign event; Senior Corporal Lozada's funeral was attended by over 4,500 police officers as well as Senator Clinton.  On January 6, 2009, Senior Corporal Norman Smith, an 18-year veteran, was shot and killed while attempting to serve an arrest warrant.

The 2016 shooting of Dallas police officers is the deadliest single incident for law enforcement officers in the U.S. since the September 11 attacks in 2001. On July 7, 2016, Micah Xavier Johnson ambushed and fired upon a group of Dallas Police Department (DPD) and Dallas Area Rapid Transit (DART) officers, killing five officers and injuring nine others. Two civilians were also wounded. The shooting happened at the end of a protest against the police killings of Alton Sterling in Baton Rouge, Louisiana, and Philando Castile in Falcon Heights, Minnesota.

Incidents involving misconduct

Murder of Santos Rodriguez

Early in the morning of July 24, 1973, Dallas police officers Darrell L. Cain and Roy Arnold were investigating a burglary, from a vending machine, of eight dollars. Two children, twelve-year-old Santos Rodriguez and thirteen-year-old David Rodriguez were taken from their home and brought to the scene of the crime. In an attempt to frighten Santos into confessing, Officer Cain, thinking he had emptied his service revolver of all its ammunition, aimed it at the boy and pulled the trigger twice. The second time, the gun discharged killing Santos, who was still handcuffed. Cain was found guilty of murder by a jury in November 1973 and sentenced to five years in prison. He served half of it. The City of Dallas apologized to the Rodriguez family forty years later.

Robert Powell 
On March 18, 2009, NFL player Ryan Moats's mother-in-law, Jonetta Collinsworth, died from breast cancer. Moats, his wife Tamisha (Collinsworth's daughter) and other family members rushed to Baylor Regional Medical Center in Plano, Texas, when they were informed that she was close to death. After driving through a red light, Moats was stopped by police officer Robert Powell who delayed him for more than 10 minutes outside the hospital's emergency room, allowing the rest of the family to leave, even after Moats's ordeal was corroborated by a nurse in the hospital to Powell. Powell even drew his gun at Moats during the incident. By the time Moats reached Collinsworth, she had died. Moats questioned whether race could have played a factor in the interaction due to the nature and tone of the officer's remarks to the family; When asked if he felt if Officer Powell be fired, Moats said, "I really don't know. All I know is what he did was wrong. I mean, he stole a moment away from me that I can never get back. I'm really not the judge on what should happen to him. I think maybe his superiors and the Dallas police should handle what should happen to him."
Officer Powell issued an apology to Moats. Police officials investigated Powell's actions; he was placed on administrative leave but later resigned from the department.
After Moats' incident with Officer Powell, former Cowboy Zach Thomas acknowledged that Powell was the same officer who handcuffed and jailed his wife Maritza after she was pulled over for making an illegal u-turn in July 2008.

Fake drug scandal
Beginning on December 31, 2001, the local ABC-affiliate, WFAA, began broadcasting a series of investigative reports alleging that hundreds of pounds of cocaine and methamphetamine seized by undercover officers of the DPD Narcotics Division during 2001 were actually not illegal substances. The subsequent "fake drug" scandal led to dismissal of over 80 drug cases by the Dallas County District Attorney's office, multiple investigations, the indictment of three current or former DPD narcotics officers, the release of defendants (many whom were falsely accused Mexican immigrants) who had pleaded guilty to cases where later investigation revealed no illegal drugs were involved and the prosecution of multiple informants that had been used to make cases that were subsequently dismissed. In 2003, the Dallas City Manager fired Dallas Police Chief Terrell Bolton, due in part for his Department's lack of oversight of the Narcotics Dept. officers involved in these fake drug arrests. He sued the City of Dallas over that firing but his case was dismissed with prejudice in 2005. Many of the 25 victims of the false arrests and wrongful prosecution won Federal Civil Rights Violations lawsuit settlements and actual jury case awards against the City of Dallas. One attorney who sued the city on behalf of what was a large percentage of Mexican immigrants who spoke little English, said, "the total cost could climb to as much as $8 million once all 25 cases are resolved."

Ronald Jones beating 
In December 2009, Dallas police officers received word that two white men were fighting in the downtown area. Failing to locate the described men, Officer Matthew Antkowiak discovered a black man crossing the street and made a pedestrian stop of him which turned into a scuffle. Other officers then joined in. The man, Ronald Jones, ended up spending fourteen months in jail on various charges. When Jones’ defense attorney viewed video tapes of the beating, he believed that the police reports had been falsified. The City contended that while the reports were inaccurate and incomplete, this was attributed in part to Officer Antkowiak's inability to accurately relate the events to the officer that did the actual report (Officer Antkowiak claimed to have suffered a closed-head injury during the incident that aggravated a prior confirmed injury). Mr. Jones was released and in March 2014 awarded $1.1 million by the city to settle the matter. Officer Antkowiak retired on an unrelated medical claim and is no longer employed in law enforcement. He has set up a private firm to train policemen. No other disciplinary action was taken against any official.

Killing of Tony Timpa 

On August 10, 2016, Dallas Police killed Tony Timpa, a 32-year-old resident who had called 911 for aid, telling the dispatcher that he had schizophrenia and depression but not taken his prescription medication. Timpa was already handcuffed when a group of officers restrained him on the ground while he squirmed, repeatedly crying out, "You're gonna kill me!". After he fell unconscious, the officers assumed he was asleep and, rather than confirm that he was breathing or feel for a pulse, joked about waking him up for school and making him breakfast. They kept him prone on grass for nearly 14 minutes and zip-tied his legs together, one pressing his knee into Timpa's back. One of the paramedics called to the scene administered the sedative Versed. The responders began to panic only as they loaded Timpa's body onto a gurney, one exclaiming, "He didn’t just die down there, did he?" Timpa died within 20 minutes of police officers' arrival, of "cocaine and the stress associated with physical restraint", according to his autopsy. It took over three years for footage of the incident to be released. The footage contradicted claims by Dallas Police that Timpa was aggressive. The officers involved were Sgt. Kevin Mansell and Officers Danny Vasquez and Dustin Dillard. Criminal charges against three officers were dropped in March 2019 and they returned to active duty.

Murder of Botham Jean 

On September 6, 2018, Dallas patrol officer Amber Guyger, in uniform but off duty after a daylong shift, entered the apartment of Botham Jean and shot and killed him. Guyger said that she had entered the apartment believing it was her own and shot Jean believing he was a burglar. She then called 911. Jean was taken to a nearby hospital, where he died from his wound. The investigation was taken over by the Texas Rangers, who were responsible for Guyger's arrest three days later. Guyger was charged with manslaughter, a 2nd degree felony in Texas, which carries a sentence of 2 to 20 years in a state prison and/or a fine not to exceed $10,000. On September 24, Guyger was terminated from the police force, after being placed on administrative leave since the shooting.

Following the shooting, an attorney representing Jean's family accused the Dallas police department of smearing Jean's reputation. The lawyers also disputed the account of the incident that Guyger told officials, which was recorded in the arrest warrant affidavit, and asserted that two independent witnesses had come forward to give recollections that conflict with Guyger's account.

On November 30, 2018, Guyger was indicted on murder charges by a Dallas County grand jury.

On September 22, 2019, the day before the trial began, Dallas County District Attorney John Creuzot took part in an interview regarding the trial in spite of a gag order issued by Judge Tammy Kemp in January of that year. After questioning jurors, who reported that they had not seen the interview or other media coverage of the trial, Kemp denied the defense's motion for a mistrial, and sequestered the jury.

On October 1, 2019, Guyger was found guilty of murder.

On October 2, 2019, Guyger was sentenced to 10 years in prison.

On October 5, it was revealed that Joshua Brown, a key witness for the prosecution, was killed after being shot more than once the previous night. Despite speculation about the motive behind Brown's killing, the slaying had nothing to do with the Jean case.

Murder of Liza Saenz and Albert Douglas 
Bryan Riser was a former 13-year veteran on the Dallas police force.  He was arrested on March 4, 2021, for the two unconnected murders of Liza Saenz and Albert Douglas in 2017. Riser was charged with two counts of capital murder. One of the men connected with the murder of Saenz told police that he and Riser had been connected with burglaries and that Riser had paid him and others $3,500 to kidnap and kill Albert Douglas, then later promised $6,000 to kill Saenz.

Rank structure and Insignia 

Members of the department who are captains and below are protected by the city's civil service system with promotion based on the results of competitive examinations. Senior corporals typically are officers who serve either as field training officers in the Patrol Division or who serve as detectives in one of the department's investigative units. The rank of captain has not been in use since 1992, however, those who were captains were allowed to keep it as well as those who were demoted from any chief position, as chiefs once demoted must retain their last civil service rank. There is currently only one captain remaining as of 2018. Majors, deputy chiefs and assistant chiefs are appointed by the chief of police without examination and do not hold civil service protection for these ranks. Division commander and bureau commander are non-civil-service titles based on assignments. Members may hold both assignment titles and civil service or appointive ranks. On October 4, 2012, Chief David Brown created a new major rank in between captain and deputy chief.

Demographics 
Breakdown of the makeup of the rank and file of DPD as of 2016:

In popular culture
The Dallas Police Department is portrayed in the 2010 Fox drama series, The Good Guys, and the 2010 TLC reality TV series, Police Women of Dallas.
 
The Dallas Police Department (Homicide Unit) is portrayed in the A&E Network's documentary series entitled The First 48.

The department's SWAT team is chronicled in the A&E Network's documentary series Dallas SWAT.

See also
2015 attack on Dallas police
2016 shooting of Dallas police officers

References

External links

Dallas Police and Firefighters employee website
Dallas Black Police Association

Dallas Police Department memorial 1910

 
Government of Dallas
1881 establishments in Texas
Government agencies established in 1881